The 2013–14 season saw Brentford return to the Championship after a 21-year absence, securing promotion from League One with three games of the season remaining and breaking their league points record.

Season review

Pre-season 

Brentford began their pre-season with an intensive training tour in Germany. Matches against Einheit Rudolstadt and FC Rot-Weiß Erfurt saw all available players get a run out, along with triallists Martin Fillo (FC Viktoria Plzeň), Daniel Müller (ex-Bayern Munich II) and assistant manager Alan Kernaghan. The domestic matches began with a home win against Millwall and a defeat to Scottish Premiership champions Celtic. Conference South opposition Boreham Wood gave Rösler the opportunity to test some of the development squad players along with new and existing squad members, before an exciting final game saw Brentford come from behind to beat Premier League side Cardiff City 3–2 at Griffin Park.

August 

The opening game of the 2013–14 season saw Shaleum Logan score a 22-yard goal as Brentford drew 1–1 with newly promoted Port Vale. Three days later a team which saw ten starting line-up changes emerged 3–2 winners over Dagenham & Redbridge in the League Cup, with a brace from Farid El Alagui on his first competitive start in 10 months. In the subsequent second round draw, Brentford were drawn away to Derby County. The first League One home game of the season ended in a 3–1 victory over Sheffield United leaving Brentford 7th in the table. Adam Forshaw opened the scoring with a shot from outside the penalty area, which was followed by two second-half goals from Will Grigg. Grigg had the opportunity to claim a hat trick on his home debut, but his 79th minute penalty was saved. The next game at Gillingham saw ex-Bees Leon Legge, Myles Weston and Stuart Nelson hold Brentford to a 1–1 draw under the guidance of ex-manager Martin Allen. Substitute El Alagui rifled home Harlee Dean's headed pass to score his third goal in three appearances.

Everton loanee Conor McAleny was stretchered off after 5 minutes during the home league game against Walsall which forced a reshuffle of Brentford's formation. Clayton Donaldson scored his first goal of the season, heading in from Shaleum Logan's cross extending Brentford's 100% home record. In the second round of the League Cup, Championship side Derby County put five goals past another vastly changed Brentford side without reply. Development squad member Josh Clarke was handed his first team debut, with colleague Alfie Mawson also making his debut as a second-half substitute. Brentford finished the month with a 0–0 draw at home to Carlisle United in a game which saw captain Tony Craig receive a straight red card after bringing down goal bound David Amoo in the second half. Brentford, with the bulk of the possession, had a vast array of shots and Toumani Diagouraga did find the back of the net, but the goal was not given due to jostling in the goal area.

Adam Forshaw's goal against Sheffield United was voted Brentford's Goal of the Month for August.

September 

Transfer deadline day saw the return of Marcello Trotta to the club on loan from Fulham and the signing of Raphaël Calvet from French side AJ Auxerre. The first round of the Football League Trophy saw Brentford's first competitive game against AFC Wimbledon. A first half goal from El Alagui left the score at 1–0 at the break. He added another in the second half and along with goals from Luke Norris, Ben Nugent and Javi Venta (all scoring their first goals for the club) the team had a 5–1 lead after 69 minutes. AFC Wimbledon attempted a late comeback clawing back two goals, but it was Brentford who progressed to the second round with a 5–3 victory. Against Bradford City at Valley Parade, David Button brought down Nahki Wells on the edge of the penalty area in the 26th minute of the game and received a straight red card. Substitute goalkeeper Jack Bonham was immediately brought on to make his League debut for the club, but Bradford capitalised on the advantage and finished 4–0 winners.

Martin Taylor and João Carlos Teixeira joined the club as the loan window opened, the latter having been a target for Serie A side Bologna. For the Tranmere Rovers game Richard Lee returned to the Brentford goal after injury and replaced David Button who was suspended after his sending off against Bradford City. Brentford started strong and scored twice in the first 15 minutes through Martin Taylor and Clayton Donaldson (Taylor's goal believed to be the fastest goal scored by a debutant for Brentford in the league). Tranmere got a goal back just before halftime and came out dominant in the second half with Adam Dugdale scoring to level the game. Donaldson added another for Brentford before Tranmere again equalised in the 90th minute with a strike from substitute Cole Stockton. The game looked to be heading for a draw until Dugdale handled in the area to concede a penalty which Adam Forshaw converted to give Brentford their first away win. Teixeira came on as a second-half substitute for George Saville to make his league debut.

In a televised match Leyton Orient arrived at Griffin Park with a 100% league record and left with their record intact. Shaleum Logan brought down Dave Mooney in the second half and the striker stepped up to convert the penalty. Orient substitute Shaun Batt then added a second with his first touch of the match on the 85th minute. A crowd of just over 2,600 watched Brentford win 2–0 against Coventry City at their temporary home, Sixfields Stadium. Clayton Donaldson grabbed the first goal, flicking over the keeper after Cyrus Christie missed his clearance, and Martin Taylor confirmed the win, heading in a cross from Sam Saunders in the second half, leaving Brentford in 10th place at the end of the month.

October 

October started with a home defeat to Rotherham United. David Button returned in goal following suspension but couldn't prevent an early goal from Mark Bradley settling the match. Brentford bowed out of the Football League Trophy with a defeat away to Peterborough United. An early own goal from Martin Taylor gave the home side the lead, and the lead was doubled in the second half when debutant Raphaël Calvet brought down Nathaniel Mendez-Laing in the box and the resulting penalty was converted by Grant McCann. Ben Nugent scored a late consolation goal but it wasn't enough to stop Brentford exiting the competition.

Brentford slumped to their 4th league defeat of the season following a 2–1 defeat at Stevenage which saw Jonathan Douglas return to the team after injury. Donaldson put Brentford ahead in the 13th minute to score his 5th of the campaign, but Stevenage responded swiftly through François Zoko. Zoko doubled his tally 11 minutes later which was enough to secure victory for the Boro and leave the Bees 11th place in the table. After going a goal down against Colchester United a third straight league defeat seemed to be on the cards before three goals in eleven minutes turned the game. Marcello Trotta levelled the score in the 76th minute before George Saville netted his first league goal to put the Bees ahead. Kadeem Harris scored the third goal on his club debut following his loan from Cardiff City, and guaranteed the points and the win.

The next game away to Bristol City saw Richard Lee return to the starting line up in goal for Brentford. City started strong and had the better of the first half, but the second half introduction of Sam Saunders for Kadeem Harris changed the game for the visitors as he became both scorer and provider. Saunders' 79th minute shot was deflected past the City keeper to put the Bees ahead and seven minutes later Clayton Donaldson was on hand to volley in a corner from the substitute. Marlon Harewood scored an injury-time consolation goal but was unable to prevent the extension of City's winless streak to 21 games. A crowd of 9,783 descended on Griffin Park to watch Brentford beat Shrewsbury Town and move up to 5th place in the league table. Marcello Trotta volleyed home the only goal of the game in the 18th minute giving the team their third win in eight days.

November 

Brentford began November with an away win at Crawley Town. Kyle McFadzean tripped Kadeem Harris in the Crawley box to concede a penalty which Adam Forshaw converted to score his third goal of the season. Ex-Bee Marcus Gayle's Staines Town were Brentford's opponents in the first round of the 2013–14 FA Cup. Ben Nugent started in place of the suspended Harlee Dean and goals from Alan McCormack, Jake Reeves, Kadeem Harris, Marcello Trotta and Clayton Donaldson sealed a 5–0 win for the Bees. Crewe Alexandra were the next visitors to Griffin Park and they departed on the wrong end of another 5–0 scoreline. Crewe defended well until the deadlock was broken on the 43rd minute by Marcello Trotta with a long range header. Brentford came out for the second half strong and immediately added a second through Forshaw. George Saville increased the lead in the 58th minute before Donaldson netted twice bringing his league goal tally to eight.

February 1993 was the last time that Brentford had visited Molineux and it was the venue for the Bees 17th league fixture of the season. The 0–0 scoreline was a fair reflection of the solid defensive displays by both sides, and although Wolves had the greater possession, Brentford notched up more on-target shots and remained 4th in the league table. Brentford's unbeaten run continued three days later with a 3–2 victory over Peterborough United. An early own goal from Gabriel Zakuani gave the Bees a one nil lead at the break, but Peterborough came back and gained the lead with goals from Jack Payne and Britt Assombalonga in the 59th and 60th minutes. The visitors defended their lead well until a reshuffle of the Brentford team led to an equaliser from George Saville (later attributed to Will Grigg), with the comeback completed in the 87th minute via Donaldson.

Two changes were made to the unbeaten starting eleven for the visit to Notts County with Toumani Diagouraga coming in for Saville in midfield and Will Grigg replacing Trotta up front. County had the better of the first half until Grigg fired home in the 44th minute and Brentford held on to the lead to secure their seventh win in the last eight league matches.

December 

Striker Paul Hayes departed after 16 months with the club, his contract being terminated by mutual agreement Off the field, Hounslow Council approved the club's application for a new 20,000 seater stadium and community facility at Lionel Road, due to open in time for the start of the 2016/17 season. Uwe Rösler was named the League One Manager of the Month for November after guiding the team to 13 points out of a possible 15 as it was announced that the club had 'reluctantly' agreed to give the manager permission to talk to Wigan Athletic about their vacant managerial position.

It was announced shortly before the FA Cup 2nd Round match at Carlisle United that Rösler had left the club to take up the role at Wigan with Assistant Manager Alan Kernaghan, First Team Coach Peter Farrell and Sporting Director Mark Warburton taking over the team in the interim. The temporary management team were unable to extend the team's unbeaten run as they were beaten 2–3 and exited the cup competition. After going a goal down before the break an own goal from Pascal Chimbonda levelled the score, but two goals from Lee Miller put the home team ahead. A late consolation from Farid El Alagui gave the Bees some hope but Carlisle defended well in the closing minutes to protect their win. Mark Warburton was announced as the new manager on 10 December, initially until the end of the season. His career got off to a good start with a home win against Oldham Athletic. Jonathan Douglas headed a late winner for the Bees to score his first of the season. Alan Kernaghan and Peter Farrell departed the club to join Rösler at Wigan while ex-Sheffield United manager David Weir was announced as Brentford's new Assistant Manager.

Clayton Donaldson was brought down by goalkeeper Declan Rudd in the 22nd minute against Preston North End and the resulting penalty was converted by Adam Forshaw. Marcello Trotta added a second three minutes later, while substitute Sam Saunders chested down and volleyed home in the second half to guarantee the win. Brentford briefly held first place in the league table following their 3–2 win over Swindon Town in an early match on Boxing Day before wins from both Wolves and Leyton Orient restored the table to the order at the start of the day. The team came back from behind twice with Trotta scoring the winner in the 77th minute.

The final game of 2013 saw the Bees entertain MK Dons at Griffin Park on 29 December. Clayton Donaldson opened the scoring in the 2nd minute and the lead was extended soon after half time with goals from Trotta and Saunders. Ex-Bee Lee Hodson grabbed a goal back for MK but the home team held on for the win, and with Wolves and Leyton Orient drawing against each other Brentford leapfrogged them both to end 2013 on top of League One.

January 

Adam Forshaw scored one penalty and missed another, Sam Saunders scored for the fourth consecutive match and Clayton Donaldson grabbed his twelfth league goal of the season as Brentford beat Peterborough on New Year's Day. The result extended Brentford's unbeaten run to 13 games, which included 12 victories. The run was extended with a home win against Port Vale on 11 January and Brentford broke a club record by winning 8 league games in row for the first time. The absence of Forshaw, Dean and Douglas saw Shaleum Logan, Kevin O'Connor and new signing Alan Judge drafted into the side and Marcello Trotta opened the scoring on thirty minutes with a strike from 25 yards. Brentford came out strong in the second half but Vale could not be broken until the 88th minute when substitute Will Grigg netted his 5th of the season. The eight match winning streak came to an end with a hard-fought draw against Walsall which gave Leyton Orient the chance to leapfrog the team and claim the top spot in League One. Donaldson headed home in the thirtieth minute meeting a Jake Bidwell cross but Craig Westcarr equalised on the stroke of half time to level the score.

Gillingham were the opponents at Griffin Park for the televised match on a wet and windy Friday night on 24 January. Jonathan Douglas put the home side ahead on the 22nd minute with a perfectly timed run to meet a Jake Bidwell cross. In the second half Tony Craig was brought down in the Gillingham box, and with regular penalty taker Adam Forshaw injured Marcello Trotta stepped up to put the demons of last season behind him and converted to put the Bees 2–0 up. Gillingham replied 3 minutes later and increased the pressure for the remainder of the game, but Brentford held on for the win. The following Tuesday Brentford were at home again, this time to Bristol City. The Bees went ahead early on when a Bidwell cross was sliced into his own net by Aden Flint, but ex-Bee Karleigh Osborne fired home an equaliser three minutes later to level the score. City continued to pile on the pressure until a shot from Alan Judge found its way into the net to put the home side ahead once more. Judge was also involved in what was to be the winning goal when he slotted a pass through the City defence to Marcello Trotta who scored his ninth league goal of the season and extended Brentford's unbeaten streak to 17 league games.

February

The unbeaten streak continued into February with a 1–1 draw away to Shrewsbury. With a strong wind affecting play the first half finished goalless but the Bees used the advantage of the wind behind them in the second half to increase the pressure on the Shrews. Marcello Trotta was brought down in the box and stepped up to take the resulting penalty. Shrewsbury goalkeeper Chris Weale was able to get a hand to the shot, only to see Trotta follow up and fire home. Brentford pushed for a second, but in the final minutes a break by Shrewsbury saw Tom Eaves level the score. The home match against Crawley Town and the away fixture against Sheffield United were both postponed due to waterlogged pitches, but Brentford remained top of the league as Leyton Orient lost both their corresponding games and Wolves also suffered a postponement. Three powerful strikes saw off Crewe at Alexandra Stadium. Alan Judge netted two, one in each half, and Adam Forshaw added the third in front of a crowd of just under 5,000.

Promotion rivals Wolverhampton Wanderers arrived at Griffin Park on 22 February to partake in a six-pointer as first played second. Despite starting the game strong, Brentford conceded late in the first half with the visitors capitalising with a brace in the second, bringing to an end the Bees 19 game unbeaten run and moving them down two places to third in the league table.

March

Injuries to first choice defenders Harlee Dean and Alan McCormack saw Nico Yennaris and débutante James Tarkowski start as Brentford travelled to Carlisle. The match, in which both teams had good chances to score, ended in a 0–0 draw leaving Brentford in third position as Leyton Orient and Wolves both won. After a quiet first half against Bradford, Clayton Donaldson fired home from outside the box to put the home team ahead. George Saville added a second to hand the Bees a 2–0 win. Three days later Brentford entertained Tranmere at Griffin Park. James Tarkowski scored his first goal for the club with a powerful second half header before Donaldson wrapped up the win twelve minutes later. The match against early league leaders and promotion rivals Leyton Orient was an early kick off to accommodate the live TV broadcast. Marcello Trotta netted in first half injury time what turned out to be the only goal of the match, and 10-man Brentford held on for the win following the sending off of James Tarkowski early in the second half, moving the team up to 2nd place in the league.

Brentford recorded their fourth straight win against Coventry at home on 22 March. Callum Wilson put the visitors ahead following a spilled save by David Button, but Donaldson and Trotta both scored to leave the Bees ahead at the break after Alan Judge had missed a penalty. Alan McCormack scored his first league goal for the club with a powerful run and a deft chip over the Coventry goalkeeper. Alan Judge conceded a penalty early into the away game at in-form Rotherham which was converted by Kieran Agard. Agard added a second before half time, and Haris Vuckic confirmed defeat for the Bees in the final minute of the match. Brentford finished the month with a goalless away draw to Oldham.

April

April began with a midweek trip away to Sheffield United. Marcello Trotta was brought down in the Blades box by Kieron Freeman and referee Eddie Ilderton immediately pointed to the penalty spot and showed a red card to the defender. However following consultation with his assistant Ilderton waved Freeman back on the pitch and rescinded the penalty decision, instead awarding a dropball. The match finished goalless and resulting point helped the Bees hold on to second position in the league table Four days later at Griffin Park visitors Notts County were reduced to 10 men soon after the 30 minute mark when Haydn Hollis brought down Clayton Donaldson in the penalty box. Adam Forshaw slotted home the penalty and Alan Judge scored either side of the break to put the Bees 3–0 up. Ex-Brentford loanee Jimmy Spencer grabbed a consolation goal for the visitors, but Brentford gained their first win in four matches.

Brentford recorded their highest points tally in the league history (87 points) as Jonathan Douglas headed the only goal in the home victory against Crawley. The following fixture away to Swindon saw David Button save a first half penalty when Alan McCormack was adjudged to have brought down Alex Pritchard in the Brentford box. Just before the break Douglas was dispossessed on the edge of the Brentford area by Louis Thompson who slotted home to score what would be the only goal of the match.

With four matches of the season remaining Brentford could mathematically secure promotion if they won against Preston, Leyton Orient lost to Crawley and Rotherham either drew or lost to Wolves. Brentford started well with Alan Judge converting a penalty after George Saville was brought down. A second penalty awarded in the second half was scuffed by Judge as he slipped during his run up, but despite a late surge from Preston, Brentford held on for the win. As word spread around Griffin Park that Orient had lost and Rotherham were losing, fans flooded onto the pitch to celebrate, but a late comeback from Rotherham prevented confirmation of the promotion. Brentford's 21-year wait to return to the 2nd tier was confirmed a few minutes later as Wolves scored two late goals to beat Rotherham 6–4.

Brentford's quest to claim the league title came to an end with a late equaliser from Izale McLeod in the game against MK Dons. James Tarkowski had put Brentford ahead before the break and Clayton Donaldson grabbed his 17th league goal of the season in the 59th minute. MK got back into the game through a Stephen Gleeson penalty and McLeod netted a last minute equaliser to hand the League One title to Wolves. The team suffered a promotion hangover with a 4–1 defeat at Colchester on 26 April After going three goals down, Stuart Dallas grabbed one back for the Bees, before Freddie Sears restored the three goal advantage.

May

The season finale at home to already relegated Stevenage saw Brentford emerge as 2–0 winners with goals from Stuart Dallas and Alan Judge. Kevin O'Connor came on as a substitute for Tony Craig in the 26th minute to make his 500th appearance for the club. A season highest attendance of 11,393 stayed behind after the final whistle to see the team presented with a trophy for finishing runners up in League One.

Season Events

 12 June: Jack Bonham signs a 2-year deal to join from Watford. Sam Saunders extends his contract, signing a 2-year deal keeping him at the club until 2015
 17 June: Jake Bidwell signs a permanent 3-year contract following a successful loan period from Everton
 24 June: Alan McCormack joins on a 2-year contract from Swindon Town. 20-year-old George Saville joins on loan from Chelsea until 5 January 2014
 27 June: Antonio German leaves the club, signing for Gillingham. Adam Forshaw extends his contract with the club until 2016
 1 July Will Grigg signs from Walsall on a 3-year deal
 3 July Doncaster Rovers confirm the signing of Harry Forrester
 11 July Javi Venta joins the club from Villarreal on a 1-year contract
 12 July Martin Fillo signs a season long loan from FC Viktoria Plzeň
 16 July Harlee Dean extends his contract until 2016
 26 July Conor McAleny joins on loan until 6 January 2014 from Everton
 30 July Simon Moore is sold to Cardiff City for an undisclosed fee. Brentford sign David Button from Charlton Athletic on a 2-year contract
 1 August Ben Nugent arrives on loan from Cardiff until 5 January
 8 August Brentford draw Derby County away in the second round of the League Cup
 9 August Emmanuel Oyeleke is loaned out to Aldershot FC until December
 15 August Goalkeeper Liam O'Brien signs on a short term deal
 17 August Brentford are drawn at home to AFC Wimbledon in the 1st round of the League Trophy
 24 August Conor McAleny suffers a broken leg and is expected to be out for most of the season
 27 August Brentford go out of the League Cup losing 5–0 to Derby County
 2 September Brentford sign Marcello Trotta on loan from Fulham until January 2014. Raphaël Calvet is signed from AJ Auxerre on a 3-year deal Conor McAleny's loan is ended following confirmation of a broken leg
 4 September Brentford progress to the second round of the League Trophy beating AFC Wimbledon 5–3
 10 September Martin Taylor joins on a one-month loan from Sheffield Wednesday. Liverpool Midfielder João Carlos Teixeira joins on a Youth loan until January 2014.
 30 September Javi Venta leaves the club, moving back to Spain for family reasons.
 4 October Alfie Mawson joins Maidenhead United on loan. Striker Paul Hayes joins Plymouth Argyle on a month's loan.
 5 October Stuart Dallas joins Northampton Town on loan.
 7 October Martin Taylor's loan is extended by a month
 8 October Loanee João Carlos Teixeira returns to Liverpool Brentford exit the Football League Trophy away to Peterborough United.
 18 October Kadeem Harris signs on loan from Cardiff City until 5 January 2014. Luke Norris is loaned out to Northampton Town until 16 November
 26 October A crowd of 9,783 watch the game between Brentford and Shrewsbury Town in a 'Pay What You Can' promotion
 27 October Brentford are drawn at home in the 1st round of the FA Cup to either Staines Town or Poole Town
 4 November Paul Hayes returns from his loan at Plymouth Argyle. Martin Taylor returns to Sheffield Wednesday.
 5 November Stuart Dallas' loan at Northampton Town is extended until 1 January.
 13 November Stuart Dallas extends his contract with the Bees until 2016
 15 November Liam O'Brien extends his short term contract until January 2014. Jack Bonham signs on loan for Arlesey Town until January 2014
 18 November Luke Norris extends his loan at Northampton Town until 4 January 2014.
 28 November Aaron Pierre joins Cambridge United until January 2014. Alfie Mawson is recalled from his loan at Maidenhead United to join Luton Town until January 2014. Joe Maloney is loaned to Burnham until January.
 3 December Paul Hayes leaves the club by mutual consent
 4 December Josh Clarke joins Maidenhead United until January 2014
 5 December A planning application for new 20,000 stadium in Lionel Road is approved. Uwe Rösler named League One Manager of the Month for November. Rösler given permission to talk to Wigan Athletic
 7 December Uwe Rösler's departure to Wigan is confirmed. Brentford go out of the FA Cup in the second round.
 10 December Mark Warburton appointed manager 'at least until the end of the current season'.
 16 December Alan Kernaghan and Peter Farrell leave and David Weir joins as Assistant Manager.
 22 December Emmanuel Oyeleke had his loan at Aldershot Town extended until 28 January.
 23 December Stuart Dallas is recalled early from his loan.
 31 December Jack Bonham's loan at Arlesey Town is extended until the end of the season.
 3 January Luke Norris returns from Northampton Town.
 6 January Ben Nugent returns to Cardiff City. Aaron Pierre returns from Cambridge United. Josh Clarke returns from Maidenhead United.
 7 January Marcello Trotta and George extend their loan deals until the end of the season.
 8 January Attacking midfielder Alan Judge joins on loan until the end of the season from Blackburn Rovers. Farid El Alagui joins Dundee United on loan until the end of the season.
 9 January Chuba Akpom signs on loan from Arsenal until 9 February. Joe Maloney's loaned at Burnham is extended until the end of the season.
 10 January Alfie Mawson returns from his loan and Luton Town. Manager Mark Warburton wins League One Manager of the Month for December. Sam Saunders wins Player of the Month for December in League One.
 14 January Liam O'Brien has his contract extended until 14 May.
 23 January Luke Norris signs on loan for Dagenham & Redbridge on loan until 23 February.
 27 January Nico Yennaris signs from Arsenal for an undisclosed fee until 2016.
 30 January Shaleum Logan joins Aberdeen on loan for the rest of the season. Emmanuel Oyeleke returns after his loan at Aldershot.
 31 January Central Defender James Tarkowski signs from Oldham until 2017. Alfie Mawson joins Welling United until the end of the season.
 6 February Ex-Manchester City Academy player Louis Hutton signs a Development Squad contract until 2015.
 8 February Jack Bonham returns from his loan at Arlesey Town.
 10 February Loanee Chuba Akpom returns to Arsenal.
 11 February Charlie Adams joins Barnet on a youth loan until the end of the season.
 13 February Richard Lee extends his contract until 2015.
 17 February Toumani Diagouraga joins League Two side Portsmouth on loan for one month. Josh Clarke joins Braintree on a Youth Loan until 12 March.
 21 February Tyrell Miller-Rodney joins Maidenhead on loan until 23 March.
 24 February Luke Norris extends his loan at Dagenham & Redbridge until 23 March.
 28 February Matthew Benham acquires a 100% shareholding of the club. Development Squad member Aaron Pierre joins Wycombe on loan until 30 March.
 10 March Charlie Adams is recalled from his loan at Barnet. Youth Team player Lewis Lavender joins Burnham on loan.
 14 March The Lionel Road application is confirmed by the Parliamentary Under Secretary of State for Planning.
 16 March Adam Forshaw is named League One Player of the Year.
 17 March Toumani Diagouraga's loan at Portsmouth is extended until the end of the season.
 20 March Charlie Adams is promoted to the First Team with a contract upgrade. Kevin O'Connor signs a new one-year contract until the summer of 2015.
 24 March Luke Norris extends his loan at Dagenham & Redbridge until the end of the season.
 26 March Toumani Diagouraga is recalled from his loan at Portsmouth.
 27 March Tyrell Miller-Rodney returns from loan at Maidenhead. Emmanuel Oyeleke returns to Aldershot on loan until the end of the season.
 31 March Aaron Pierre extends his loan at Wycombe until the end of the season.
 16 April Josh Clarke is promoted from the Development Squad to the First Team.
 1 May Emmanuel Oyeleke, Alfie Mawson, Joe Taylor, Lewis Lavender & George Pilbeam return from their non-League loans.
 5 May Alan McCormack is named Supporters' Player of the Year, Tony Craig wins Players' Player of the Year and Bees Travel Club Player of the Year, Adam Forshaw claims Goal Of The Season, Marcello Trotta wins Bees Player Moment Of The Season for his goal against Leyton Orient and Clayton Donaldson and Kevin O'Connor were joint winners of the Community Player of the Year award. Kevin O'Connor also receives a special presentation to commemorate 500 appearances for the club.'
 7 May Luke Norris and Aaron Pierre return from their respective loans at Dagenham & Redbridge and Wycombe.
 10 May Adam Forshaw is named Junior Bees Player of the Year.
 13 May Shaleum Logan's loan at Aberdeen end.
 16 May Aaron Pierre turns down a Development Squad contract and joins Wycombe Wanderers.
 17 May Farid El Alagui's loan at Dundee United ends.
 27 May Scott Barron, Farid El Alagui, Shaleum Logan and Liam O'Brien are released by the club.

Pre season

German Training Camp Friendlies

Domestic Friendlies

League One

League results summary

Results and position by round

League table

Matches

August

September

October

November

December

January

February

March

April

May

Matchday Squads 

1 1st Substitution, 2 2nd Substitution, 3 3rd Substitution
Source: brentfordfc.co.uk

Score overview

FA Cup

Matches

Matchday Squads 

1 1st Substitution, 2 2nd Substitution, 3 3rd Substitution
Source: brentfordfc.co.uk

League Cup

Matches

Matchday Squads 

1 1st Substitution, 2 2nd Substitution, 3 3rd Substitution
Source: brentfordfc.co.uk

Football League Trophy

Matches

Matchday Squads 

1 1st Substitution, 2 2nd Substitution, 3 3rd Substitution
Source: brentfordfc.co.uk

First Team squad 
Players' ages are as of the opening day of the 2013–14 season.

Source: soccerbase.com

Coaching staff 

Last updated 10 January 2014

Statistics

Appearances and goals 

Last updated 31 May 2014

|-
|colspan="14"|Players featured for Brentford on loan this season:

 Players listed in italics left the club mid-season.

Goalscorers 

 Players listed in italics left the club mid-season.
 Source: Soccerbase

Discipline 

 Players listed in italics left the club mid-season.
 Source: Soccerbase

Management 

1Alan Kernaghan, Peter Farrell & Mark Warburton
Source: brentfordfc.co.uk

Competition summary by month
Last Updated 8 April 2014

Transfers & loans

Kit 

For the 2013–14 season adidas return as kit manufacturers having previously supplied kits in the early 1980s. For the 2nd consecutive year local transport company SKYex is the kit sponsor.

|
|
|
|
|

1 Alternate Kit

Development squad

Squad 
Players' ages are as of the opening day of the 2013–14 senior season.

Source: brentfordfc.co.uk

Professional Development League Two South Division

League table
Matches played up to 31 May 2014

Matches

Matchday Squads 

1 1st Substitution, 2 2nd Substitution, 3 3rd Substitution
Source: brentfordfc.co.uk

References

External links 
 Brentford FC – the club's website
 Soccerbase – 2013–14 season statistics

2013–14
2013–14 Football League One by team